Azman Adnan (born on 1 November 1971) is a former Malaysian footballer. He is also a former member of the Malaysian pre-Olympic team and also the Malaysian national team scoring 17 international goals in 52 appearances. He also played for Malaysia national futsal team, and was in the squad that took part in the 1996 FIFA Futsal World Championship in Spain. He previously won the Malaysia Premier League 1 Golden Boots as he scored 13 goals for Penang FA in 1999. He is a former head coach for PDRM FA.

He is an avid Selangor FA fan since he was a child. His father was a soldier from Kajang, Selangor and his mother are from Pedas, Negeri Sembilan. During 1993-1998, he partnered with Rusdi Suparman in front as they became the formidable striker duo for Selangor FA. He was a Selangor FA legend after he spent a long time playing with them. He won many trophies in Malaysian football such as the M-League title, the Malaysian FA Cup and the Malaysia Cup. He was described as the 'next Mokhtar Dahari' in Malaysian football.

He retired in 2004 with his last club Selangor FA. Now he works as coach at youth academy in Kuala Lumpur with DBKL. He was also one of eight couples that joined reality TV "Sehati Berdansa" (in Astro Ria channel) in 2007.

Honours

Player
Kuala Lumpur
 Malaysia Cup: 1989

Selangor
 Liga Semi-Pro Divisyen 2: 1993
 Malaysia Cup: 1995, 1996, 1997, 2002
 Malaysian FA Cup: 1997
 Malaysian Charity Shield: 1996, 1997, 2002

Negeri Sembilan
 Malaysian FA Cup: 2003

International
 Indonesian Independence Cup: 1992
 Pestabola Merdeka: 1993

Individual
 Premier League 1 Top Scorer: 1999

Manager
PDRM
 People's Cup: 2015

References

External links
 
 BIOGRAFI AZMAN ADNAN at azmanadnan.com 

Malaysian footballers
Malaysian people of Malay descent
Malaysia international footballers
Living people
Penang F.C. players
Selangor FA players
Kuala Lumpur City F.C. players
Negeri Sembilan FA players
1971 births

Association football forwards
Footballers at the 1994 Asian Games
Asian Games competitors for Malaysia